Daniel Shak (born May 7, 1959) is an American semi-professional poker player and hedge fund manager known for his accomplishments in high buy-in poker events.

Poker career

Prior to poker, Shak was a trader on the New York Mercantile and Commodities Exchange (COMEX). In 2002, Shak established SHK Asset Management, a hedge fund focused on gold futures.

He began seriously focusing on poker in 2004. In 2005, he had his first World Series of Poker cash totaling $45,000. He has been active on the circuit since and came close to winning his first WSOP bracelet in 2010 when he came in second to Chris Bell at the $5,000 Pot-Limit Omaha Hi-low Split-8 or Better event.

Shak has participated in the World Poker Tour, though he has been less successful. He cashed for $70,000 at the 2007 North American Poker Championships in Ontario. Shak has been most successful at the Aussie Millions where he scored his biggest cash for $1,107,553 at 2010 $100,000 buy in event.

In March 2013, Shak won the $125,000 Party Poker Premier League Poker VI in London winning $528,000, defeating Sam Trickett heads-up.

Shak has always considered poker a hobby and turned down any business offers related to it. However in 2013, at the request of friend Phil Ivey, Shak made an exception and joined Ivey Poker.

, his total live tournament winnings exceed $7,400,000 of which $709,290 have come from cashes at the WSOP.

Personal life
Shak is the son of Paula J. Felmeister (nee Cohen). He was married to poker player and model Beth Shak; the two divorced in 2009. In 2012, Dan Shak sued Beth over a shoe collection containing 1,200 shoes worth approximately $1 million, but then subsequently dropped the lawsuit. In 2014, Dan Shak married former model Anna Shak.  He was recently charged with manipulating gold and silver markets.

References

External links
 Daniel Shak Hendon Mob profile
 

20th-century American Jews
American poker players
Living people
1959 births
21st-century American Jews